Laithwaite is a surname. Notable people with the surname include:

 Eric Laithwaite (1921–1997), English electrical engineer
 Sir Gilbert Laithwaite (1894–1986), Irish-British civil servant and diplomat
 James Laithwaite (born 1991), English rugby league player
 Peter Laithwaite (born 1967), English entrepreneur and technologist